Zutik was a political party in Basque Country, Spain which was dissolved in 2009. Zutik was formed in 1991 through the merger of the EMK and LKI—the Basque branch of LCR. Within Zutik there is a current affiliated to the United Secretariat of the Fourth International. Zutik had a branch in Navarre known as Batzarre.

Zutik members ran once on electoral lists of Euskal Herritarrok (EH), but in the 2004 Spanish general election, Zutik put an electoral platform together with Aralar. Both were opposing ETA violence.

External links
Official website
Defunct socialist parties in the Basque Country (autonomous community)
Political parties established in 1991
Political parties disestablished in 2009
1991 establishments in Spain
2009 disestablishments in Spain